Bruce Stewart may refer to:

Bruce Stewart (cricketer) (born 1949), New Zealand cricketer
Bruce Stewart (playwright) (1936–2017), New Zealand fiction writer and dramatist
Bruce Stewart (rugby league) (1941–2012), Australian rugby league footballer
Bruce Stewart (scriptwriter) (1925–2005), television scriptwriter
Bruce Stewart (racing driver) (born 1939), Australian racing driver

See also
Bruce Hylton-Stewart (1891–1972), played first-class cricket for Somerset and Cambridge University between 1912 and 1914
Bruce Stuart (1881–1961), Canadian ice hockey player
Stewart Bruce (disambiguation)
Stewart (name)